Khalid Al-Karkhi (born 15 August 1940) is an Iraqi boxer. He competed at the 1960 Summer Olympics and the 1964 Summer Olympics.

References

1940 births
Living people
Iraqi male boxers
Olympic boxers of Iraq
Boxers at the 1960 Summer Olympics
Boxers at the 1964 Summer Olympics
Sportspeople from Baghdad
Light-welterweight boxers